The 2017–18 UTEP Miners women's basketball team represents the University of Texas at El Paso during the 2017–18 NCAA Division I women's basketball season. The Miners, led by first year head coach Kevin Baker, play their home games at Don Haskins Center and were members of Conference USA. They finished the season 17–14, 7–9 in C-USA play to finish in a 3 way tie for seventh place. They advanced to the quarterfinals of the C-USA women's tournament where they lost to UAB.

Previous season
They finished the season 8–23, 5–13 for in C-USA play to finish in a tie for eleventh place. They lost in the first round of the C-USA women's tournament to Old Dominion.

Roster

Schedule

|-
!colspan="9" style=| Exhibition

|-
!colspan="9" style=| Non-conference regular season

|-
!colspan="9" style=| Conference USA regular season

|-
!colspan="9" style=| C-USA Women's Tournament

Rankings
2017–18 NCAA Division I women's basketball rankings

See also
2017–18 UTEP Miners men's basketball team

References

UTEP Miners women's basketball seasons
UTEP